Jason Ardizzone-West is an American scenic designer, production designer, and architect. He received the 2018 Emmy Award for Outstanding Production Design for a Variety Special for Jesus Christ Superstar Live (NBC Universal).

Personal life & education

Ardizzone-West grew up in Worcester, Massachusetts where he got his start in scenic design creating sets for the former Worcester Forum Theatre Ensemble at age 15. His parents are Wendy and Richard Ardizzone, respectively the founder and associate director of a Worcester children's music education program, The Joy Of Music Program. He began designing sets professionally at Worcester Forum Theatre while attending high school at Doherty Memorial High School. He graduated from high school in 1990 and then went on to earn a Bachelor of Architecture from Cornell University, College of Architecture, Art & Planning in 1995. After completing his undergraduate degree, Jason Ardizzone-West worked for Mitchell Kurtz Architect PC.

He earned a Masters of Fine Arts from New York University, Tisch School of the Arts, Department of Design for Stage and Film in 2012.

Ardizzone-West lives in Yonkers, New York with his wife and two children.

Selected designs
 2015 Hungry, The Public Theater, written & directed by Richard Nelson
 2015 Bullets Over Broadway, NETworks Presentations, directed by Susan Stroman
 2015 Adele, Live in New York City, NBC, co-designed with Es Devlin
 2016 What Did You Expect?, The Public Theater, written & directed by Richard Nelson
 2016 Women Of A Certain Age, The Public Theater, written & directed by Richard Nelson
 2017 Illyria, The Public Theater, written & directed by Richard Nelson
 2018 Uncle Vanya, The Old Globe & Hunter Theater Project, translated & directed by Richard Nelson
 2018 Wandering City, The Brooklyn Academy of Music, written & performed by Ethel String Quartet
 2018 Good Grief, Vineyard Theatre, written by Ngozi Anyanwu, directed by Awoye Timpo
 2018 Lana Del Rey, LA To The Moon Tour
 2018 Jesus Christ Superstar Live, NBC, directed by David Leveaux & Alex Rudzinski 
 2019 Dermot Kennedy, North American Tour 
 2019 The Michaels, The Public Theater, written & directed by Richard Nelson
 2019 Once On This Island, Actors Theatre of Louisville & Cincinnati Playhouse, directed by Robert Barry Fleming
 2020 Common, Bluebird Memories, Audible @ The Minetta Lane, directed by Awoye Timpo
 2019 Blue Man Group, NETworks Presentations, directed by Jenny Koons
 2020 School Girls, Or The African Mean Girls Play, Berkeley Repertory Theatre, directed by Awoye Timpo
 2020 Bliss, 5th Avenue Theatre, directed by Sheryl Kaller
 2020 Common, Say Peace, The Tonight Show Starring Jimmy Fallon, directed by Awoye Timpo
 2020 Ordinary Days, Pittsburgh Playhouse, written by Adam Gwon, directed by Dave Solomon
 2021 Black Picture Show, Artists Space, written by Bill Gunn, directed by Awoye Timpo
 2021 Amend: The Fight For America, Netflix, The Documentary Group, Overbrook Entertainment, hosted by Will Smith, directed by Kenny Leon
 2021 What Happened?: The Michaels Abroad, The Hunter Theatre Project, directed by Richard Nelson
 2022 The Bluest Eye, Huntington Theatre Company, directed by Awoye Timpo
 2022 Grace, Ford’s Theatre, by Nolan Williams Jr & Nikkole Salter, directed by Robert Barry Fleming
 2022 Wedding Band, Theatre For A New Audience, written by Alice Childress, directed by Awoye Timpo
 2022 The Source, Miami City Ballet, choreographed by Claudia Schreier, directed by Adam Barrish

Awards

References

External links 
 
 Jason Ardizzone-West's IMDb.com Profile
 Jason Ardizzone-West's Internet Broadway Database Profile

Year of birth missing (living people)
Living people
American graphic designers
American architects
People from Worcester, Massachusetts
People from Yonkers, New York
Tisch School of the Arts alumni
Cornell University College of Architecture, Art, and Planning alumni
Doherty Memorial High School alumni
Primetime Emmy Award winners